Leonard A. Hall (born 20 September 1907, date of death unknown) was a Rhodesian and later South African boxer who competed in the 1928 Summer Olympics. He was born in Johannesburg.

In 1928 while representing Rhodesia, he defeated William Walther of Germany before being eliminated in the second round of the welterweight class after losing his bout to Kintaro Usuda of Japan. At the 1930 Empire Games he represented South Africa and won the gold medal in the welterweight class after winning the final against Howard Williams of Canada.

External links

1907 births
Year of death missing
Boxers from Johannesburg
Rhodesian male boxers
Welterweight boxers
Olympic boxers of Rhodesia
Boxers at the 1928 Summer Olympics
Boxers at the 1930 British Empire Games
Commonwealth Games gold medallists for South Africa
White Rhodesian people
South African emigrants to Rhodesia
South African male boxers
Commonwealth Games medallists in boxing
Medallists at the 1930 British Empire Games